Abraham Stoker (8 November 1847 – 20 April 1912) was an Irish author who is celebrated for his 1897 Gothic horror novel Dracula. During his lifetime, he was better known as the personal assistant of actor Sir Henry Irving and business manager of the Lyceum Theatre, which Irving owned. In his early years, Stoker worked as a theatre critic for an Irish newspaper, and wrote stories as well as commentaries. He also enjoyed travelling, particularly to Cruden Bay where he set two of his novels. During another visit to the English coastal town of Whitby, Stoker drew inspiration for writing Dracula. He died on 20 April 1912 due to locomotor ataxia and was cremated in north London. Since his death, his magnum opus Dracula has become one of the most well-known works in English literature, and the novel has been adapted for numerous films, short stories, and plays.

Early life
Stoker was born on 8 November 1847 at 15 Marino Crescent, Clontarf, on the northside of Dublin, Ireland. The park adjacent to the house is now known as Bram Stoker Park. His parents were Abraham Stoker (1799–1876) from Dublin and Charlotte Mathilda Blake Thornley (1818–1901), who was raised in County Sligo. Stoker was the third of seven children, the eldest of whom was Sir Thornley Stoker, 1st Bt. Abraham and Charlotte were members of the Church of Ireland Parish of Clontarf and attended the parish church with their children, who were baptised there. Abraham was a senior civil servant.

Stoker was bedridden with an unknown illness until he started school at the age of seven, when he made a complete recovery. Of this time, Stoker wrote, "I was naturally thoughtful, and the leisure of long illness gave opportunity for many thoughts which were fruitful according to their kind in later years." He was privately educated at Bective House school run by the Reverend (William Woods).

After his recovery, he grew up without further serious illnesses, even excelling as an athlete at Trinity College, Dublin, which he attended from 1864 to 1870. He graduated with a BA in 1870, and paid to receive his MA in 1875. Though he later in life recalled graduating "with honours in mathematics", this appears to have been a mistake. He was named University Athlete, participating in multiple sports, including playing rugby for Dublin University. He was auditor of the College Historical Society (the Hist) and president of the University Philosophical Society (he remains the only student in Trinity's history to hold both positions), where his first paper was on Sensationalism in Fiction and Society.

Early career
Stoker became interested in the theatre while a student through his friend Dr. Maunsell. While working for the Irish Civil Service, he became the theatre critic for the Dublin Evening Mail, which was co-owned by Sheridan Le Fanu, an author of Gothic tales. Theatre critics were held in low esteem at the time, but Stoker attracted notice by the quality of his reviews. In December 1876, he gave a favourable review of Henry Irving's Hamlet at the Theatre Royal in Dublin. Irving invited Stoker for dinner at the Shelbourne Hotel where he was staying, and they became friends. Stoker also wrote stories, and "Crystal Cup" was published by the London Society in 1872, followed by "The Chain of Destiny" in four parts in The Shamrock. In 1876, while a civil servant in Dublin, Stoker wrote the non-fiction book The Duties of Clerks of Petty Sessions in Ireland (published 1879), which remained a standard work. Furthermore, he possessed an interest in art and was a founder of the Dublin Sketching Club in 1879.

Lyceum Theatre

In 1878, Stoker married Florence Balcombe, daughter of Lieutenant-Colonel James Balcombe of 1 Marino Crescent.  She was a celebrated beauty whose former suitor had been Oscar Wilde. Stoker had known Wilde from his student days, having proposed him for membership of the university's Philosophical Society while he was president. Wilde was upset at Florence's decision, but Stoker later resumed the acquaintanceship, and, after Wilde's fall, visited him on the Continent.

The Stokers moved to London, where Stoker became acting manager and then business manager of Irving's Lyceum Theatre, London, a post he held for 27 years. On 31 December 1879, Bram and Florence's only child was born, a son whom they christened Irving Noel Thornley Stoker. The collaboration with Henry Irving was important for Stoker and through him, he became involved in London's high society, where he met James Abbott McNeill Whistler and Sir Arthur Conan Doyle (to whom he was distantly related). Working for Irving, the most famous actor of his time, and managing one of the most successful theatres in London made Stoker a notable if busy man. He was dedicated to Irving and his memoirs show he idolised him. In London, Stoker also met Hall Caine, who became one of his closest friends – he dedicated Dracula to him.

In the course of Irving's tours, Stoker travelled the world, although he never visited Eastern Europe, a setting for his most famous novel. Stoker enjoyed the United States, where Irving was popular. With Irving he was invited twice to the White House, and knew William McKinley and Theodore Roosevelt. Stoker set two of his novels in America, and used Americans as characters, the most notable being Quincey Morris. He also met one of his literary idols, Walt Whitman, having written to him in 1872 an extraordinary letter that some have interpreted as the expression of a deeply-suppressed homosexuality.

Bram Stoker in Cruden Bay 

Stoker was a regular visitor to Cruden Bay in Scotland between 1892 and 1910. His month-long holidays to the Aberdeenshire coastal village provided a large portion of available time for writing his books. Two novels were set in Cruden Bay: The Watter's Mou' (1895) and The Mystery of the Sea (1902). He started writing Dracula there in 1895 while in residence at the Kilmarnock Arms Hotel. The guest book with his signatures from 1894 and 1895 still survives. The nearby Slains Castle (also known as New Slains Castle) is linked with Bram Stoker and plausibly provided the visual palette for the descriptions of Castle Dracula during the writing phase. A distinctive room in Slains Castle, the octagonal hall, matches the description of the octagonal room in Castle Dracula.

Writings

Stoker visited the English coastal town of Whitby in 1890, and that visit was said to be part of the inspiration for Dracula. He began writing novels while working as manager for Irving and secretary and director of London's Lyceum Theatre, beginning with The Snake's Pass in 1890 and Dracula in 1897. During this period, Stoker was part of the literary staff of The Daily Telegraph in London, and he wrote other fiction, including the horror novels The Lady of the Shroud (1909) and The Lair of the White Worm (1911).  He published his Personal Reminiscences of Henry Irving in 1906, after Irving's death, which proved successful, and managed productions at the Prince of Wales Theatre.

Before writing Dracula, Stoker met Ármin Vámbéry, a Hungarian-Jewish writer and traveller (born in Szent-György, Kingdom of Hungary  now Svätý Jur, Slovakia). Dracula likely emerged from Vámbéry's dark stories of the Carpathian mountains. However this claim has been challenged by many including Elizabeth Miller, a professor who, since 1990, has had as her major field of research and writing Dracula, and its author, sources, and influences. She has stated, “The only comment about the subject matter of the talk was that Vambery 'spoke loudly against Russian aggression.'" There had been nothing in their conversations about the "tales of the terrible Dracula" that are supposed to have "inspired Stoker to equate his vampire-protagonist with the long-dead tyrant." At any rate, by this time, Stoker's novel was well underway, and he was already using the name Dracula for his vampire. Stoker then spent several years researching Central and East European folklore and mythological stories of vampires.

The 1972 book In Search of Dracula by Radu Florescu and Raymond McNally claimed that the Count in Stoker's novel was based on Vlad III Dracula. However, according to Elizabeth Miller, Stoker borrowed only the name and "scraps of miscellaneous information" about Romanian history; further, there are no comments about Vlad III in the author's working notes.

Dracula is an epistolary novel, written as a collection of realistic but completely fictional diary entries, telegrams, letters, ship's logs, and newspaper clippings, all of which added a level of detailed realism to the story, a skill which Stoker had developed as a newspaper writer. At the time of its publication, Dracula was considered a "straightforward horror novel" based on imaginary creations of supernatural life. "It gave form to a universal fantasy ... and became a part of popular culture."

According to the Encyclopedia of World Biography, Stoker's stories are today included in the categories of horror fiction, romanticized Gothic stories, and melodrama. They are classified alongside other works of popular fiction, such as Mary Shelley's Frankenstein, which also used the myth-making and story-telling method of having multiple narrators telling the same tale from different perspectives. According to historian Jules Zanger, this leads the reader to the assumption that "they can't all be lying".

The original 541-page typescript of Dracula was believed to have been lost until it was found in a barn in northwestern Pennsylvania in the early 1980s. It consisted of typed sheets with many emendations, and handwritten on the title page was "THE UN-DEAD." The author's name was shown at the bottom as Bram Stoker. Author Robert Latham remarked: "the most famous horror novel ever published, its title changed at the last minute." The typescript was purchased by Microsoft co-founder Paul Allen.

Stoker's inspirations for the story, in addition to Whitby, may have included a visit to Slains Castle in Aberdeenshire, a visit to the crypts of St. Michan's Church in Dublin, and the novella Carmilla by Sheridan Le Fanu.

Stoker's original research notes for the novel are kept by the Rosenbach Museum and Library in Philadelphia. A facsimile edition of the notes was created by Elizabeth Miller and Robert Eighteen-Bisang in 1998.

Stoker at The London Library 
Stoker was a member of The London Library and conducted much of the research for Dracula there. In 2018, the Library discovered some of the books that Stoker used for his research, complete with notes and marginalia.

Death

After suffering a number of strokes, Stoker died at No. 26 St George's Square, London on 20 April 1912. Some biographers attribute the cause of death to overwork, others to tertiary syphilis. His death certificate listed the cause of death as "Locomotor ataxia 6 months", presumed to be a reference to syphilis. He was cremated, and his ashes were placed in a display urn at Golders Green Crematorium in north London. The ashes of Irving Noel Stoker, the author's son, were added to his father's urn following his death in 1961. The original plan had been to keep his parents' ashes together, but after Florence Stoker's death, her ashes were scattered at the Gardens of Rest.

Beliefs and philosophy
Stoker was raised a Protestant in the Church of Ireland. He was a strong supporter of the Liberal Party and took a keen interest in Irish affairs. As a "philosophical home ruler", he supported Home Rule for Ireland brought about by peaceful means. He remained an ardent monarchist who believed that Ireland should remain within the British Empire, an entity that he saw as a force for good. He was an admirer of Prime Minister William Ewart Gladstone, whom he knew personally, and supported his plans for Ireland.

Stoker believed in progress and took a keen interest in science and science-based medicine. Some of Stoker's novels represent early examples of science fiction, such as The Lady of the Shroud (1909). He had a writer's interest in the occult, notably mesmerism, but despised fraud and believed in the superiority of the scientific method over superstition. Stoker counted among his friends J. W. Brodie-Innis, a member of the Hermetic Order of the Golden Dawn, and hired member Pamela Colman Smith as an artist for the Lyceum Theatre, but no evidence suggests that Stoker ever joined the Order himself. Although Irving was an active Freemason, no evidence has been found of Stoker taking part in Masonic activities in London. The Grand Lodge of Ireland also has no record of his membership.

Posthumous
The short story collection Dracula's Guest and Other Weird Stories was published in 1914 by Stoker's widow, Florence Stoker, who was also his literary executrix. The first film adaptation of Dracula was F. W. Murnau's Nosferatu, released in 1922, with Max Schreck starring as Count Orlok. Florence Stoker eventually sued the filmmakers, and was represented by the attorneys of the British Incorporated Society of Authors. Her chief legal complaint was that she had neither been asked for permission for the adaptation nor paid any royalty. The case dragged on for some years, with Mrs. Stoker demanding the destruction of the negative and all prints of the film. The suit was finally resolved in the widow's favour in July 1925. A single print of the film survived, however, and it has become well known. The first authorised film version of Dracula did not come about until almost a decade later when Universal Studios released Tod Browning's Dracula starring Bela Lugosi.

Dacre Stoker
Canadian writer Dacre Stoker, a great-grandnephew of Bram Stoker, decided to write "a sequel that bore the Stoker name" to "reestablish creative control over" the original novel, with encouragement from screenwriter Ian Holt, because of the Stokers' frustrating history with Dracula's copyright. In 2009, Dracula: The Un-Dead was released, written by Dacre Stoker and Ian Holt. Both writers "based [their work] on Bram Stoker's own handwritten notes for characters and plot threads excised from the original edition" along with their own research for the sequel. This also marked Dacre Stoker's writing debut.

In spring 2012, Dacre Stoker (in collaboration with Elizabeth Miller) presented the "lost" Dublin Journal written by Bram Stoker, which had been kept by his great-grandson Noel Dobbs. Stoker's diary entries shed a light on the issues that concerned him before his London years. A remark about a boy who caught flies in a bottle might be a clue for the later development of the Renfield character in Dracula.

Commemorations
On 8 November 2012, Stoker was honoured with a Google Doodle on Google's homepage commemorating the 165th anniversary of his birth.

An annual festival takes place in Dublin, the birthplace of Bram Stoker, in honour of his literary achievements. The 2014 Bram Stoker Festival encompassed literary, film, family, street, and outdoor events, and ran from October 24 to 27 in Dublin. The festival is supported by the Bram Stoker Estate and funded by Dublin City Council and Fáilte Ireland.

Bibliography

Novels
 The Primrose Path (1875)
 The Chain of Destiny (1875)
 The Snake's Pass (1890)
 The Fate of Fenella (consecutive novel, chapter 10) (1891-1892) 
 The Watter's Mou' (1895)
 The Shoulder of Shasta (1895)
 Dracula (1897)
 Miss Betty (1898)
 The Mystery of the Sea (1902)
 The Jewel of Seven Stars (1903, revised 1912)
 The Man (1905); issued also as The Gates of Life
 Lady Athlyne (1908)
 The Lady of the Shroud (1909)
 The Lair of the White Worm (1911, posthumously abridged 1925); issued also as The Garden of Evil
 Seven Golden Buttons (written in 1891, much material reused in Miss Betty; posthumously published in 2015)

Short story collections
 Under the Sunset (1881) – eight fairy tales for children
 Snowbound: The Record of a Theatrical Touring Party (1908)
 Dracula's Guest and Other Weird Stories (1914)

Uncollected stories

Non-fiction
 The Duties of Clerks of Petty Sessions in Ireland (1879)
 A Glimpse of America (1886)
 Personal Reminiscences of Henry Irving (1906)
 Famous Impostors (1910)
 Great Ghost Stories (1998) (Compiled by Peter Glassman, Illustrated by Barry Moser)
 Bram Stoker's Notes for Dracula: A Facsimile Edition (2008) Bram Stoker Annotated and Transcribed by Robert Eighteen-Bisang and Elizabeth Miller, Foreword by Michael Barsanti. Jefferson, NC & London: McFarland.

Articles
 "Recollections of the Late W. G. Wills", The Graphic, 19 December 1891
 "The Art of Ellen Terry", The Playgoer, October 1901 
"The Question of a National Theatre", The Nineteenth Century and After, Vol. LXIII, January/June 1908
"Mr. De Morgan's Habits of Work", The World's Work, Vol. XVI, May/October 1908
"The Censorship of Fiction", The Nineteenth Century and After, Vol. LXIV, July/December 1908
"The Censorship of Stage Plays", The Nineteenth Century and After, Vol. LXVI, July/December 1909
"Irving and Stage Lightning", The Nineteenth Century and After, Vol. LXIX, January/June 1911

Critical works on Stoker
William Hughes, Beyond Dracula: Bram Stoker's Fiction and Its Cultural Context (Palgrave, 2000) 
Belford, Barbara. Bram Stoker: A Biography of the Author of Dracula. London: Weidenfeld and Nicolson, 1996.
Hopkins, Lisa. Bram Stoker: A Literary Life. Basingstoke, England: Palgrave Macmillan, 2007.
Murray, Paul. From the Shadow of Dracula: A Life of Bram Stoker (London: Jonathan Cape, 2004)
Senf, Carol. Science and Social Science in Bram Stoker's Fiction (Greenwood, 2002).
Senf, Carol. Dracula: Between Tradition and Modernism (Twayne, 1998).
Senf, Carol A. Bram Stoker (University of Wales Press, 2010).
Shepherd, Mike. When Brave Men Shudder: the Scottish origins of Dracula (Wild Wolf Publishing, 2018).
Skal, David J. Something in the Blood: The Untold Story of Bram Stoker (Liveright, 2016)

Bibliographies
William Hughes Bram Stoker – Victorian Fiction Research Guide

References

External links

 
 
 
 

h2g2 article on Bram Stoker
 
 Archival material at 
 
 

 
1847 births
1912 deaths
19th-century essayists
19th-century Irish male writers
19th-century Irish non-fiction writers
19th-century Irish novelists
19th-century Irish short story writers
19th-century journalists
19th-century travel writers
20th-century biographers
20th-century essayists
20th-century historians
20th-century Irish male writers
20th-century Irish non-fiction writers
20th-century Irish novelists
20th-century Irish short story writers
20th-century journalists
Alumni of Trinity College Dublin
Auditors of the College Historical Society
The Daily Telegraph people
Dracula
Dublin University Football Club players
Ghost story writers
Golders Green Crematorium
Irish Anglicans
Irish biographers
Irish essayists
Irish fantasy writers
Irish historians
Irish horror writers
Irish journalists
Irish literary critics
Irish male non-fiction writers
Irish male novelists
Irish male short story writers
Irish mystery writers
Irish science fiction writers
Irish theatre critics
Irish theatre managers and producers
Irish thriller writers
Irish travel writers
Journalists from Dublin (city)
People from Clontarf, Dublin
Surrealist writers
Theatre people from Dublin (city)
Theatre theorists
Victorian novelists
Weird fiction writers
Writers from Dublin (city)
Writers of Gothic fiction